Colin Reid is an acoustic guitarist from Belfast, Northern Ireland. He launched his solo career in 1997 after supporting performances with other leading musicians such as Brian Kennedy and Waterson–Carthy. He was a guitar teacher for many years and formalised his skills at the Musicians Institute of Technology. He has run guitar courses in the Crescent Arts Centre in the past.

He has released three albums. His eponymous debut album was released by Shetland's Veesik Records in 1999. In 2000 he received a New Voices commission from the Celtic Connections festival. 
He has since released Tilt (2001), and Swim (2006). He played the club tent at the Cambridge Folk Festival in 2001. He played in Eddi Reader's band in 2003.

References

Shetland music
Guitarists from Northern Ireland
Irish male guitarists
Acoustic guitarists
Musicians from Belfast
Living people
Year of birth missing (living people)